Judeo-Italian (or Judaeo-Italian, Judæo-Italian, and other names including Italkian) is an endangered Jewish language, with only about 200 speakers in Italy and 250 total speakers today. The language is one of the Italian languages. Some words have Italian prefixes and suffixes added to Hebrew words as well as Aramaic roots.

The term Judeo-Italian
The glottonym  is of academic and relatively late coinage. In English, the term was first used (as Judæo-Italian) by Lazaro Belleli in 1904 in the Jewish Encyclopedia, describing the languages of the Jews of Corfu. That same year, Umberto Cassuto used the term , in the following (here translated into English):

Other designations

The Italian Jewish rite is sometimes called , and linguists use  as a description of words of Romance origin in Yiddish.
In 1587, David de Pomis used the word  in reference to the Italian glosses in his trilingual dictionary.
Vulgar Latin varieties.
 After the institution of the Ghetto forced Jewish communities throughout Italy into segregation, the term  was identified with local Jewish varieties of regional dialects.
 The English neologism Italkian was coined in 1942 by Solomon Birnbaum, who modelled the word on the modern Hebrew adjective  , 'Italian', from the Middle Hebrew adjective  (< ), 'Italic' or 'Roman'.

Influence on other Jewish languages
According to some scholars, there are some Judeo-Italian loan words that have found their way into Yiddish. The use of words for 'school' to mean 'synagogue' dates back to the Roman Empire. Another example is Yiddish , from the Judeo-Italian  ('gentile', 'non-Jew', 'Christian'), as differentiated from the standard Italian , meaning 'noble', 'gentleman'.

There are also several loanwords from Judeo-Italian dialects in Judeo-Gascon, due to the migration of a few Italian families to the Sephardi communities in Gascony during the 18th and 19th centuries.

Dialects
Judeo-Italian regional dialects, include:
Judeo-Ferraran in Ferrara
Judeo-Florentine in Florence
Judeo-Mantuan in Mantua
Judeo-Modenan in Modena
Judeo-Piedmontese in the region of Piedmont
Judeo-Reggian in the region of Reggio Emilia of Emilia-Romagna
Judeo-Roman in Rome
Judeo-Venetian in Venice
Bagitto in Livorno

At least two Judeo-Italian varieties, based on the Salentino and Venetian languages, were also used in Corfu.

Characteristics
This feature is unique among Jewish languages, although there are arguably parallels in Jewish English dialect.

Also common are lexical incorporations from Hebrew, particularly those applicable to daily life. Terms from other Jewish languages such as Yiddish and Judeo-Spanish were also incorporated. Bagitto, the dialect of Livorno, is particularly rich in loanwords from Judeo-Spanish and Judeo-Portuguese.

It was claimed by Cassuto that most Judeo-Italian dialects reflect the Italian dialect of places further to the south, due to the fact that since the expulsion of the Jews from the Kingdom of Naples, the general direction of Jewish migration in Italy had been northward.

Use in works and publications
One of the most accessible ways to view the Judeo-Italian language is by looking at translations of biblical texts such as the Torah and Hagiographa. For example, the Judeo-Italian language is represented in a 1716 Venetian Haggadah, a Jewish prayer book typically used during a seder, some samples of which are available online.

Today, there are two locations, the Oxford Bodleian Library, and the Jewish Theological Seminary in New York, in which many of these texts have been archived.

ISO and Library of Congress classifications

"Italkian" is not used by the US Library of Congress as a subject heading, nor does it figure as a reference to Judeo-Italian. The authorized subject heading is "Judeo-Italian language". Subheadings are:
Judeo-Italian language: Glossaries, vocabularies, etc.
Judeo-Italian language: Grammar.
Judeo-Italian language: Italy Livorno Glossaries, vocabularies, etc.
Judeo-Italian language: Texts.

The subject reference is: Judeo-Italian dialect.
LC-MARC uses the following language code: Judeo-Italian.
Assigned collective code: [ita] (Italian).

See also
 Italian Jews
 Judeo-Latin
 Judeo-Romance languages
 Ladino

Notes

References

External links

 
Languages of Italy
Endangered Romance languages
Gallo-Italic languages
Jews and Judaism in Italy